Garfield Township is a township in Clay County, Kansas, USA.  As of the 2000 census, its population was 107.

Geography
According to the USGS, it contains one cemetery, Center Mission.

References
 USGS Geographic Names Information System (GNIS)

External links
 US-Counties.com

Townships in Clay County, Kansas
Townships in Kansas